The Omolon is a large river in far eastern Russia.

Omolon may also refer to:
Omolon (rural locality), a rural locality (a selo) in Chukotka Autonomous Okrug, Russia
Omolon Airport
Omolon (meteorite), a meteorite fallen in Russia
Nelbert Omolon